Bryan David "Butch" Vig (born August 2, 1955) is an American musician, songwriter, and record producer, best known as the drummer and co-producer of the alternative rock band Garbage and the producer of the diamond-selling Nirvana album Nevermind. His work on the latter earned him the nickname the Nevermind Man.

A native of Wisconsin, Vig was based in  Madison for much of his career, from studying at the University of Wisconsin to performing in local bands Spooner and Fire Town. He eventually set up his own recording studio in Madison, Smart Studios, with bandmate Steve Marker. After becoming well-known as a producer, he formed and played drums with Garbage, who sold 17 million records over a ten-year period. Vig returned to producing full-time when Garbage went on hiatus in 2005. The band reconvened in 2010 to record material for their fifth album. In 2012, NME named Vig the 9th greatest producer.

Early life
Butch Vig was born Bryan David Vig in Viroqua, Wisconsin, son of DeVerne William Vig (1922-2021) and Betty Jeanette (1931-2005), née Brewster. DeVerne Vig was a hospital staff doctor who practised medicine with his twin, David, and their elder brother, Edward, in Viroqua for nearly forty years; Betty Vig was a music teacher and clinic administrator who played an active role in the community as a Sunday School teacher, Girl Scout leader, and director of the Country Club and Viroqua Bloodmobile Service. Vig has two siblings, Chris and Lisa. Vig acquired the nickname Butch as a child, due to the severe crew cut his father gave him. Vig studied piano for six years. After seeing The Who perform on The Smothers Brothers, he swapped his piano for a $60 drum kit.

Moving to Madison, Vig enrolled at the University of Wisconsin to study film direction.

Career

Early musical career
While a student at the University of Wisconsin, Vig met his eventual Garbage bandmate Steve Marker. Vig contributed several electronic music soundtrack pieces to low-budget films, including one song on Slumber Party Massacre, a Hollywood B-movie. This soundtrack work stirred Vig's interest in the manipulation of sound. Vig joined a number of garage pop bands, including Eclipse, and in 1978 formed Spooner with Duke Erikson, Dave Benton, Jeff Walker and Joel Tappero.

The following year, Vig helped Marker to build a home studio in Marker's basement. Marker and Vig also started a small label, Boat Records, to release records of Spooner – which included their 1979 debut EP, "Cruel School" – and other bands they liked, which led to around twenty local acts. The self-producing was later described by Vig as "kind of a trial by fire".

In 1984, Vig and Marker founded Smart Studios in Madison, while still performing drums in Spooner at night and driving a taxi cab during the day. When Spooner lost momentum, Vig formed a band called First Person with Marker and Phil Davis and a side-project called Fire Town featuring Davis and Erikson. Fire Town quickly became Vig's priority, and after their first album was signed to Atlantic Records. Atlantic hired producer Michael Fondelli to work with Fire Town on their second album. While the sessions did not do well, and the resulting record sank, Vig learned a lot of production techniques from the process. Fire Town split, and Vig reformed Spooner for a final album before working as a producer became his full-time career.

Production career

Vig's first high-profile production work was in 1991, when he produced albums by two bands, The Smashing Pumpkins' Gish and Nirvana's Nevermind. Vig incorporated overdubs and vocal double tracking, whereas Nirvana's previous album, Bleach (produced by Jack Endino) had a more "lo-fi" sound. Kurt Cobain originally refused to double-track his vocals and guitars but Vig reportedly got him to comply by saying "John Lennon double-tracked". Cobain would later criticize Vig for the album's slickness, although this might be due to Andy Wallace's mixing of the album. Cobain said that "Butch Vig...recorded the album perfectly," in a 1993 MTV interview. Billy Corgan welcomed Vig's elaborate production on The Smashing Pumpkins' Siamese Dream. This album met with positive commercial and critical reception, also breaking another indie band into the mainstream.  Vig also produced two critically praised Sonic Youth albums, 1992's Dirty and 1994's Experimental Jet Set, Trash and No Star.

Vig worked with Jimmy Eat World on their sixth album, Chase This Light, released in October 2007. He is also working on soundtracks for two new movies. His first production for an English band was 2008's All or Nothing by The Subways. He also worked with Against Me!, producing their two Sire Records releases,  New Wave and  White Crosses, as well as working with singer Laura Jane Grace on her solo EP, Heart Burns. Vig produced the eighth studio album by Green Day, 2009's 21st Century Breakdown, which won the Grammy Award for Best Rock Album. Recently, Vig has been partnered in duties by his engineer and mixer Billy Bush who also worked on Garbage's albums and live tours.

Vig composed and produced the soundtrack for the film The Other Side. In 2009 Vig recorded two new tracks for the long-awaited greatest hits release by the Foo Fighters, most notably the single "Wheels" and ultimately produced their April 2011 follow-up, Wasting Light. In 2010, Vig produced Muse's single, "Neutron Star Collision (Love Is Forever)," which was featured on the Twilight Saga: Eclipse soundtrack.

In 2020, Vig produced the soundtrack for the 2021 film Puppy Love, including tracks by Portugal. The Man, LP, Mickey Avalon, Wayne Newton, and others.

Garbage

Vig stated, "Part of the reason why I started Garbage was that by the time I'd done Nevermind,' I'd recorded – I swear to God – 1,000 bands that were just guitar-bass-drums. I was reading about all these other records that I was getting excited about – like Public Enemy using a sampler in the studio – and I just decided I wanted to do a bit of a U-turn." Afterwards, they hired Scottish singer Shirley Manson and began composing together.

Garbage released a string of singles in 1995–1996, including "Stupid Girl" and "Only Happy When It Rains". Their debut album, Garbage, was an unexpected smash, selling over 4 million copies and certified double platinum in the UK, United States and Australia. Garbage won the Breakthrough Artist award at the 1996 MTV Europe Music Awards. The band then spent two years working on follow-up album, Version 2.0, which topped the charts in the UK upon its 1998 release and the following year was nominated for two Grammy Awards, Album of the Year and Best Rock Album. Version 2.0 went on to match the sales of its predecessor. Garbage followed this up by performing and co-producing the theme song to the nineteenth James Bond movie The World Is Not Enough.

Despite being named one of Rolling Stones Top 10 Albums of The Year, Garbage's 2001 third album Beautiful Garbage failed to match the commercial success achieved by its predecessors. Garbage quietly disbanded in late 2003, but regrouped to complete fourth album Bleed Like Me in 2005, peaking at a career-high #4 in the U.S. The band cut short their concert tour in support of Bleed Like Me announcing an "indefinite hiatus", emphasizing that they had not broken up, but wished to pursue personal interests. In 2006, Vig returned to producing while Manson worked on a solo album (as yet unreleased). Garbage ended their hiatus in 2007, and released greatest hits retrospective Absolute Garbage. Worldwide, the band have sold over 17 million albums. The band got back together in 2010 and began recording their new album, Not Your Kind of People, which was released internationally on May 14, 2012. This was followed by Strange Little Birds, released on June 10, 2016.

The Emperors of Wyoming
In 2011, Vig formed an alt-country band called The Emperors of Wyoming together with Phil Davis, Frank Anderson and Pete Anderson. They released a self-titled album on September 17, 2012.

5 Billion in Diamonds
In 2017, Vig debuted a new musical project, the band 5 Billion in Diamonds. Their first album was released on August 11, 2017. Their second Divine Accidents was released on November 20, 2020

Personal life
Vig is married to Beth Halper, a former DreamWorks A&R executive; they have a daughter, Bo Violet. They live in the Silver Lake district of Los Angeles.

Discography

Spooner
Every Corner Dance (1982)
Wildest Dreams (1985)
The Fugitive Dance (1990)

Fire Town
In the Heart of the Heart Country (1987)
The Good Life (1989)

Garbage
Garbage (1995)
Version 2.0 (1998)
Beautiful Garbage (2001)
Bleed Like Me (2005)
Not Your Kind of People (2012)
Strange Little Birds (2016)
No Gods No Masters (2021)

5 Billion in Diamonds
5 Billion in Diamonds (2017)
Divine Accidents (2020)

Production career

Vig served as the record producer, or co-producer on the following records:

1983: Mecht Mensch – Acceptance EP
1984: Killdozer – Intellectuals Are the Shoeshine Boys of the Ruling Elite
1984: Juvenile Truth - no enemy
1985: The Other Kids – Living in the Mirror
1985: Killdozer – Snake Boy
1985: Laughing Hyenas – Come Down to the Merry Go Round
1986: Killdozer – Burl
1987: The Other Kids – Happy Home
1987: Killdozer – Little Baby Buntin'
1988: Die Kreuzen – Century Days
1988: Killdozer – For Ladies Only
1989: Killdozer – Twelve Point Buck
1989: Laughing Hyenas- You Can't Pray a Lie
1989: feedtime – Suction
1990: Urge Overkill – Americruiser
1990: King Snake Roost – Ground into the Dirt
1990: Laughing Hyenas – Life of Crime
1990: The Fluid – Glue
1991: The Fluid – Spot the Loon
1991: Cosmic Psychos – Blokes You Can Trust
1991: The Smashing Pumpkins – Gish
1991: Nirvana – Nevermind
1991: Tad – 8-Way Santa
1991: Young Fresh Fellows – Electric Bird Digest
1991: Die Kreuzen – Cement
1992: Die Kreuzen – Internal
1992: Sonic Youth – Dirty
1992: House of Pain – Shamrocks and Shenanigans
1992: L7 – Bricks Are Heavy
1992: Chainsaw Kittens – Flipped Out in Singapore
1992: Drain – Pick Up Heaven
1993: Crash Vegas – Stone
1993: The Smashing Pumpkins – Siamese Dream
1993: Gumball – Real Gone Deal
1994: Sonic Youth – Experimental Jet Set, Trash and No Star
1994: Helmet – Betty
1994: Freedy Johnston – This Perfect World
1995: Soul Asylum – Let Your Dim Light Shine
1995: Garbage – Garbage
1998: Garbage – Version 2.0
2001: Garbage – Beautiful Garbage
2003: AFI – Sing the Sorrow
2005: Garbage – Bleed Like Me
2007: Jimmy Eat World – Chase This Light
2007: Against Me! – New Wave
2008: The Subways – All or Nothing
2008: Laura Jane Grace – Heart Burns
2009: Green Day – 21st Century Breakdown
2009: Foo Fighters – Greatest Hits
2010: Against Me! – White Crosses
2010: Muse – "Neutron Star Collision (Love Is Forever)"
2010: Never Shout Never – Harmony
2010: Goo Goo Dolls – Something for the Rest of Us
2011: Foo Fighters – Wasting Light
2012: Garbage – Not Your Kind of People
2013: Sound City Players – Sound City: Real To Reel
2014: Foo Fighters – Sonic Highways
2016: Garbage – Strange Little Birds
2019: Silversun Pickups – Widow's Weeds
2021: Garbage – No Gods No Masters
2022: Silversun Pickups – Physical Thrills

Remix work
Butch Vig has remixed songs for the following artists: Against Me!, Ash, Beck, The Cult, Depeche Mode, EMF, Fun Lovin' Criminals, House of Pain, Korn, Limp Bizkit, Alanis Morissette, Nine Inch Nails, Michael Penn, M.O.P and U2, as well as his own band Garbage.

References

External links

 
 Official website Garbage
 Butch Vig Interview at drummagazine.com
 Butch Vig Interview on nerdist.com (Podcast)

 Juvenile Truth; no enemy; Madison, WI Juvenile Truth; no enemy (Lyrics & Photos)

1957 births
Living people
American rock drummers
American male drummers
Record producers from Wisconsin
Garbage (band) members
University of Wisconsin–Madison alumni
Businesspeople from Madison, Wisconsin
People from Viroqua, Wisconsin
Musicians from Madison, Wisconsin
Grammy Award winners
20th-century American drummers